The News Herald is an American, English language daily newspaper based in Morganton, North Carolina covering Burke County, North Carolina. The preceding newspapers include The Morganton Herald (1889–1901) and The Burke County News (1899–1901). The News Herald is a member of the North Carolina Press Association.

History
Predecessor newspapers include:
 The Morganton Herald. (Morganton, N.C.) 1889–1901
 The Burke County News. (Morganton, N.C.) January 13, 1899–November 1901

The newspaper took the name of The News Herald in November 1901.

See also
 List of newspapers in North Carolina

References

External links
 
 

1889 establishments in North Carolina
Burke County, North Carolina
Daily newspapers published in North Carolina
Lee Enterprises publications
Newspapers established in 1889